Aircraft maintenance engineer may refer to:
 An aircraft maintenance technician in general
 The Aircraft Maintenance Engineer licensed qualification
Aircraft maintenance engineer (Canada)